Puran Chandra Gupta (2 January 1912 – 16 September 1986) was an Indian journalist who founded the Dainik Jagran media group and it Hindi-language publication Dainik Jagran, which remains the most popular daily newspaper in India.

Biography
Gupta was born in Kalpi and educated in Kalpi and Varanasi. In 1940 he launched a nationalist weekly newspaper Swatantra in Kanpur. The newspaper was disapproved by the British administration and had to move to Jhansi. There in 1942 he started the daily newspaper Jagran, which in 1947 was renamed into Dainik Jagran. In 1975 Gupta was elected as chairman of the Press Trust of India. Besides, for 15 years he was an executive member of The Indian Newspaper Society and served as its Vice President.

Legacy
In 1987, the Sri Puranchandra Gupta Smarak Trust was established in Kanpur. The trust is engaged in educational, spiritual, cultural, and philanthropic activities.

References

Indian male journalists
Indian newspaper editors
Indian newspaper publishers (people)
Businesspeople from Uttar Pradesh
1912 births
1986 deaths
Journalists from Uttar Pradesh